Pedro David Muñoz Leiva (born 24 November 1987) is a Chilean lawyer who was elected as a member of the Chilean Constitutional Convention.

References

External links
 

1987 births
Living people
21st-century Chilean politicians
Socialist Party of Chile politicians
Members of the Chilean Constitutional Convention
People from Loncoche